Cosmopterosis thetysalis is a moth in the family Crambidae. It was described by Francis Walker in 1859. It is found from southern Venezuela and north-western Brazil north to the coast of Suriname and French Guiana.

References

Glaphyriinae
Moths described in 1859